Myoga, myoga ginger or Japanese ginger is the species Zingiber mioga in the family Zingiberaceae. It is a deciduous herbaceous perennial native to Japan, China, and the southern part of Korea. Only its  edible flower buds and flavorful shoots are used in cooking.  The flower buds are finely shredded and used in Japanese cuisine as a garnish for miso soup, sunomono, and dishes such as roasted eggplant. In Korean cuisine, the flower buds are skewered alternately with pieces of meat and then are pan-fried.

Cultivation
A traditional crop in Japan, myoga ginger has been introduced to cultivation in Australia and New Zealand for export to the Japanese market.

As a woodland plant, myoga has specific shade requirements for its growth.

Three variegated cultivars are known: 'Dancing Crane', 'Silver Arrow' and 'White Feather'. They are less cold-hardy than unvariegated plants.

Medicinal properties 
Some constituents of myoga are cytotoxic; others have shown promise for potentially anticarcinogenic properties.

Gallery

References

External links 
 "Myoga" at 4seasonseeds.com.au

Inflorescence vegetables
Japanese cuisine
Japanese vegetables
Stem vegetables
Zingiber
Flora of China
Flora of Japan
Flora of Korea